Developing by working is a concept of regional economic theory. It refers to the capability of workers both to improve their productivity and raise their income as being employed in rural areas by government initiatives. 

The increased productivity is achieved through practice, self-perfection and minor innovations, as mentioned by Kenneth Arrow within the concept of Learning by doing.  Achieving learning by doing stage, they become qualified, they can earn more so their aggregate income grows. When their total incomes grows, they will be able to save more, therefore, benefit extra gains from savings. In developing by working stage, workers firstly become qualified (learning by-doing) so qualified workers paid more than unqualified.

The concept of developing by working has been modeled by Mustafa Cicek, a Turkish economist within his PhD thesis at KTU Trabzon, Turkey, in his design of endogenous and unbalanced regional growth theory to explain the effects of employment of unqualified rural people by government initiatives.

For a developing economy which experiences seriously regional imbalances, the structure of the economy does not allow all people to be employed and all factors to be used in the provinces. To tackle these problems through regionalizing both endogenous and unbalanced growth models, the Endogenous and Unbalanced Regional Growth (EURG) for regional economies has been modeled. In this model, the state is actively participating. 

In addition, the endogenous characteristics of regions are being considered with globalization, postmodernism and new economy. There are three units, first of which are planned for traditional agricultural sector, the second is for modern sector, and the third is for knowledge sector. In the first unit, the unqualified unemployed people are being employed by government initiatives. The backward and forward linkages are created among the regions. The second unit produces modern production. The third unit produces knowledge and knowledge-intensive output which supplies both internal and external markets. The more it sells to external markets, the more both regional and personal income rise. 

Triggered by the employment of regional people, the “developing by working” stage, which goes beyond the learning by doing, can be experienced. As for qualified people, the more they earn, the more they can save, so their aggregate income grows. Therefore, the higher capital and knowledge accumulation leads to boom in regional economy.

The EURG model is being adapted to regions where agricultural sector is dominant to introduce opportunities for growth. To secure optimum production scale, it is advised that planning the agricultural sector be done by taking into consideration territory, quantity and type of yield.

Further reading 
Endogenous and Unbalanced Regional Growth (EURG), Blacksea Technical University (ktu.edu.tr) Turkey, PhD Thesis, 2006.

Regional economics